Discocalyx is a genus of flowering plants belonging to the family Primulaceae.

Its native range is Philippines to Western Pacific.

Species:

Discocalyx albiflora 
Discocalyx amplifolia 
Discocalyx angustifolia 
Discocalyx angustissima 
Discocalyx brachybotrya 
Discocalyx brassii 
Discocalyx crinita 
Discocalyx cybianthoides 
Discocalyx dissecta 
Discocalyx effusa 
Discocalyx euphlebia 
Discocalyx filipes 
Discocalyx fusca 
Discocalyx hymenandroides 
Discocalyx insignis 
Discocalyx kaoyae 
Discocalyx ladronica 
Discocalyx latepetiolata 
Discocalyx leytensis 
Discocalyx linearifolia 
Discocalyx listeri 
Discocalyx longifolia 
Discocalyx longissima 
Discocalyx luzoniensis 
Discocalyx macrophylla 
Discocalyx maculata 
Discocalyx megacarpa 
Discocalyx merrillii 
Discocalyx mezii 
Discocalyx micrantha 
Discocalyx mindanaensis 
Discocalyx minor 
Discocalyx montana 
Discocalyx orthoneura 
Discocalyx pachyphylla 
Discocalyx palauensis 
Discocalyx palawanensis 
Discocalyx papuana 
Discocalyx perseifolia 
Discocalyx phanerophlebia 
Discocalyx philippinensis 
Discocalyx ponapensis 
Discocalyx psychotrioides 
Discocalyx pygmaea 
Discocalyx samarensis 
Discocalyx sarcophylla 
Discocalyx schlechteri 
Discocalyx sessilifolia 
Discocalyx silvestris 
Discocalyx stenophylla 
Discocalyx subsinuata 
Discocalyx suluensis 
Discocalyx tecsonii 
Discocalyx vidalii 
Discocalyx xiphophylla

References

Primulaceae
Primulaceae genera